Alberic of Ostia (1080–1148) was a Benedictine monk, and Cardinal Bishop of Ostia from 1138 to 1148.

He was born at Beauvais in France.  He entered the monastery of Cluny and became its sub-prior and, later, prior of Saint-Martin-des-Champs, but was recalled (1126) to Cluny by Peter the Venerable, to aid in the restoration of discipline in that famous monastery.

In 1131, he was Abbot of Vezelay in the Diocese of Autun, and held that office until he was made Cardinal-Bishop of Ostia by Pope Innocent II (1138). Immediately after his consecration Alberic went as papal legate to England. He was successful in his endeavours to end the war then raging for possession of the throne between the usurper Stephen of Blois and David I of Scotland, who had espoused the cause of Empress Matilda.

He then called a legatine council of all the bishops and abbots of England, which assembled at London, December 1138, and at which eighteen bishops and about thirty abbots were present. The chief business of the council, besides some disciplinary measures, was the election of an archbishop for the See of Canterbury. Thibaut, Abbot of Bec, was chosen, and consecrated by Alberic.

Accompanied by Thibaut and other bishops and abbots, he returned to Rome in January 1139. The same year, Alberic was sent to exhort the inhabitants of Bari, a town on the Adriatic, to acknowledge as their lawful sovereign Roger II of Sicily, against whom they were in revolt.

They refused, however, to listen to the legate of the Holy See, and shut their gates against him. In 1140, Alberic was appointed to examine into the conduct of Ralph of Domfront, Latin Patriarch of Antioch. In a council of eastern bishops and abbots at Jerusalem, over which Alberic presided, Ralph was deposed and cast into prison (30 November 1140). Pope Eugene III sent Alberic (1147) to combat the Albigenses in the neighbourhood of Toulouse.

In a letter written at this time to the bishops of that district, St Bernard of Clairvaux calls Alberic "the venerable Bishop of Ostia, a man who has done great things in Israel, through whom Christ has often given victory to His Church".

St Bernard was induced to join the legate, and it was owing chiefly (according to the Catholic Encyclopedia) "to the miracles and eloquence of the Saint" that the embassy was in some degree successful.

Three days before the arrival of St Bernard, Alberic had been given a very cold welcome. The populace, in derision of his office, had gone to meet him, riding on asses, and escorted him to his residence with the music of rude instruments. It is said of him that he could not win the people, but that the Albigensian leaders feared him more than any other cardinal of his time. The last work of Alberic was that of co-operating with St Bernard in promoting the Second Crusade. He it was who arranged with Louis VII of France the details of the undertaking.

He died at Verdun on 20 November 1148, according to the necrology of St.-Martin-des-Champes. St. Bernard of Clairvaux celebrated the funeral mass.

References

Bibliography

External links
Salvador Miranda – consistory of 1138

12th-century French cardinals
Cardinal-bishops of Ostia
French abbots
Diplomats of the Holy See
French Benedictines
Cluniacs
Benedictine cardinals
Benedictine abbots
Benedictine bishops
French Christian monks
12th-century Christian monks
People from Beauvais
1080 births
1148 deaths